The Marriage Maker is a lost 1923 American silent fantasy film produced by Famous Players-Lasky and distributed by Paramount Pictures. It is based on a Broadway play, The Faun, by Edward Knoblock. On stage the faun character was played by William Faversham. William C. deMille directed and his wife Clara Beranger wrote the scenario.

Cast
Agnes Ayres - Alexandra Vancy
Jack Holt - Lord Stonbury
Charles de Rochefort - Sylvani
Robert Agnew - Cyril Overton
Mary Astor - Vivian Hope-Clarke
Ethel Wales - Mrs. Hope-Clarke
Bertram Johns - Fish
Leo White - Morris

References

External links

allmovie/synopsis; The Marriage Maker
Lantern slide; The Marriage Maker(Wayback Machine)
Webpage devoted to the film with still and lobby poster; The Marriage Maker

1923 films
American silent feature films
Lost American films
Films directed by William C. deMille
American films based on plays
Paramount Pictures films
American black-and-white films
American fantasy films
1920s fantasy films
1923 lost films
Lost fantasy films
1920s American films